The UEFA European Football Championship has featured mascots since 1980. The first mascot was Pinocchio, for the UEFA Euro 1980 in Italy. Since then, every tournament has had a mascot except for the UEFA Euro 2008 and UEFA Euro 2012, that both had two. The mascots are mostly targeted at children, with cartoon shows and other merchandise released to coincide with the competition.

List of mascots  
There have been a total of 12 mascots (a duo was featured in both 2008 and 2012) in the nine tournaments since 1980:

See also
 List of FIFA World Cup official mascots
 List of Copa América official mascots
 List of Africa Cup of Nations official mascots
 List of AFC Asian Cup official mascots

References

External links
The weird and wonderful world of EURO mascots at UEFA.com

mascot
Association football mascots
Lists of mascots